WOOZ-FM (99.9 FM) is a radio station  broadcasting a country music format. Licensed to Harrisburg, Illinois, United States, the station serves the Marion-Carbondale (IL) area.  The station is currently owned by Max Media and licensed to MRR License LLC.

History
The station was assigned the call letters WEBQ-FM on 1947-9-1. On 1989-08-02, the station changed its call sign to the current WOOZ-FM.

Ownership
In December 2003, Mississippi River Radio, acting as Max Media LLC (John Trinder, president/COO), reached an agreement to purchase WCIL, WCIL-FM, WJPF, WOOZ-FM, WUEZ, WXLT, KCGQ-FM, KEZS-FM, KGIR, KGKS, KJEZ, KKLR-FM, KLSC, KMAL, KSIM, KWOC, and KZIM from the Zimmer Radio Group (James L. Zimmer, owner). The reported value of this 17 station transaction was $43 million.

References

External links

OOZ-FM
Country radio stations in the United States
Radio stations established in 1981
Max Media radio stations
1981 establishments in Illinois